Dr. József Kovács (born 15 July 1951) is a Hungarian physician and politician, member of the National Assembly (MP) for Gyula (Békés County Constituency II then III) since 2010.

Kovács is the current Vice President of the Hungarian Red Cross since 2008. He was a member of the Parliamentary Committee on Health since 14 May 2010. He was elected Chairman of the Committee on Health, when István Mikola, then Chairman, was appointed Hungarian Ambassador to the Organisation for Economic Co-operation and Development (OECD), and resigned from his parliamentary seat on 28 February 2011. He was elected Vice Chairman of the Committee on Welfare following the 2014 parliamentary election.

Personal life
He is married and has three children.

References

1951 births
Living people
Fidesz politicians
Members of the National Assembly of Hungary (2010–2014)
Members of the National Assembly of Hungary (2014–2018)
Members of the National Assembly of Hungary (2018–2022)
Members of the National Assembly of Hungary (2022–2026)
People from Bács-Kiskun County
20th-century Hungarian physicians